Histria Diamond  is a Chemical/Oil Products Tanker owned by the Romanian shipping company Histria Shipmanagement and is registered in Valletta, Malta.

History
Histria Diamond was built by the Constanța Shipyard in 2006 as a  ship used for the transportation of oil and oil products and chemical products. 
The ship is chartered by the Italian oil and natural gas company Eni.

Technical description
The Histria Diamond is equipped with a double hull, one two-stroke acting diesel engine MAN B&W 6S50MC-C with a capacity of  directly acting on the propeller shaft and a four-bladed fixed propeller built by Wärtsilä Propulsion Netherlands. It also has another three auxiliary MAN B&W 6L23/30H diesel engines with a capacity of  each. The ship has 14 hydraulically driven centrifugal deepwell Framo cargo pumps, 10 pumps with a capacity of 1105 m3/hour, two pumps with a capacity of 442 m3/hour, one pump with a capacity of 221 m3/hour and one portable pump with a capacity of 332 m3/hour.

The ship has ten cargo tanks, two tanks with a capacity of 7,846 m3, four tanks with a capacity of 10,820 m3, four tanks with a capacity of 11,271 m3 and two slop tanks with a capacity of 2,210 m3.

References

Ships built in Romania
1989 ships
Merchant ships of Romania